"Tokyo" is a song by American electronica project Owl City. The song features Japanese pop band Sekai no Owari and was released on October 7, 2014. "Tokyo" was also featured as an exclusive track on the Japanese release of Owl City's fifth studio album, Mobile Orchestra.

Background
Owl City announced the release date for the song on September 29, 2014 along with another track, "You're Not Alone". Speaking about the meaning of the song, Young stated, "'Tokyo' is about the many sleepless nights I've spent in Japan due to jet lag. Something in the atmosphere there is very conducive to creativity." Young also stated that he was "very honored" to work with Sekai no Owari. Written and produced by Young, the track runs at 128 BPM and is in the key of E major.

Music video
A visualizer video for "Tokyo" premiered on November 18, 2014. The video contains footage of their performance during the Tokyo Fantasy event which was held in October 2014 at Fuji-Q Highland in Yamanashi. Young spoke about performing the song live with Sekai no Owari stating, "It felt good. I've never played on such a beautiful stage. Just standing on the stage was so inspiring."

Credits and personnel
Credits adapted from AllMusic.

 Owl City – composer, primary artist
 Sekai no Owari – featured artist

Charts

Weekly charts

Year-end charts

Release history

References

2014 songs
2014 singles
Owl City songs